John Enrique Córdoba Córdoba; (born 10 February 1987) is a Colombian footballer who last played for Cobán Imperial as a forward.

Career
In July 2014, Córdoba moved to Azerbaijan Premier League team AZAL, signing a two-year contract, but left the club in the December of the same year.

Career statistics

References

External links

1987 births
Living people
Colombian footballers
Association football forwards
Categoría Primera A players
Categoría Primera B players
Azerbaijan Premier League players
Venezuelan Primera División players
Bolivian Primera División players
Asociación Civil Deportivo Lara players
Deportivo Miranda F.C. players
Club Bolívar players
Zamora FC players
Trujillanos FC players
Cúcuta Deportivo footballers
América de Cali footballers
AZAL PFK players
C.D. Suchitepéquez players
Colombian expatriate footballers
Expatriate footballers in Venezuela
Expatriate footballers in Bolivia
Expatriate footballers in Azerbaijan
Expatriate footballers in Guatemala
Sportspeople from Chocó Department